Yuka Saitō may refer to:

, Japanese essayist
, Japanese voice actress

See also 
 Saitō
 Yuka (name)